A Space is a Canadian artist-run centre located in Toronto, Ontario

Background

The gallery originated as the Nightingale Arts Council in 1970, and was founded in 1971. The name A Space Gallery was first used when the gallery established itself at 85 St. Nicholas Street. The first exhibition Concept 70 was organized by Robert Bowers and Chris Youngs and included works by Ian Carr-Harris, Stephen Cruise, John McEwen, Dennis Oppenheim and General Idea. It focuses on political and social art work, such as the 2015 Detention exhibition. A Space Gallery receives funding from the Ontario Arts Council.

See also 
 List of museums in Toronto

References

External links
 A Space website

Art museums and galleries in Ontario
Artist-run centres
Arts organizations established in 1971
Organizations based in Toronto